Sunbury railway station may refer to:

Sunbury railway station, Melbourne, Australia 
Sunbury railway station, Surrey, England